Monte Pulito is a small village (curazia) located in San Marino. It belongs to the castle of Faetano.

History

During the Second World War, between 17 and 20 of September 1944, the hill around Monte Pulito was the site of a battle between the 4th Indian Division (British India) and the 278th Infantry Division (Nazi Germany). The engagement is known as "Battle of San Marino" or "Battle of Monte Pulito".

Geography
Monte Pulito is located under the same named hill, on the road between Faetano and the city of San Marino.

See also
Faetano
Cà Chiavello
Calligaria
Corianino

Curazie in San Marino
Faetano